Sweet Lips (or "Sweetlips") is an unincorporated community in Chester County, Tennessee, United States.

The first settlers arrived in the 1820s.  Residents have claimed that the name comes from "settlers (or wandering hobos or thirsty Civil War soldiers, depending on whom you ask) who declared water from a creek to be 'sweet to the lips.'"  Sweet Lips has frequently been noted on lists of unusual place names.

A 1986 profile on the community reported a population of 85, no stop signs or street lights, no post office, and that the former two-room school house was now the "Sweet Lips Grocery" store.  The school closed in 1960.

Some scenes from the 1973 movie Walking Tall were filmed in Sweet Lips.

References

External links

Unincorporated communities in Chester County, Tennessee
Unincorporated communities in Tennessee